Juliano is a surname. Notable people with the surname include:

Sports
Álvaro Juliano (born 1991), Brazilian footballer
Antonio Juliano (born 1943), Italian footballer

Arts
Auguste Pilati Juliano (1810–1877), French composer
Jamian Juliano-Villani (born 1987), American painter
Kyle Juliano (born 1997), Filipino pop singer
Otávio Juliano (born 1972), Brazilian filmmaker

Crime
Anthony Michael Juliano (1922 – 2001), American thief
Joseph Juliano (born 1938), American mobster

Science
Jonathan J Juliano, American scientist
Jose Juliano, Filipino scientist
María Dolores Juliano (born 1932), Argentine anthropologist

See also

Giuliano
Julian (surname)
Julio (surname)

Italian-language surnames